The 14th Pan American Games were held in Santo Domingo, Dominican Republic from August 1 to August 17, 2003.

Results by event

See also
Saint Kitts and Nevis at the 2002 Central American and Caribbean Games
Saint Kitts and Nevis at the 2004 Summer Olympics

References

Nations at the 2003 Pan American Games
2003
Pan American Games